Elizabeth Bainbridge (born 28 March 1930) is a retired English opera singer. Her career in singing spanned several decades. She achieved most of her successes while a member of the company of the Royal Opera House, Covent Garden, London. Bainbridge is a mezzo-soprano and contralto.

Early life
Bainbridge was born on 28 March 1930 in Rawtenstall, Lancashire in the North of England. She left school at the age of 14, and worked in the weaving mills of Lancashire during the last year of  Second World War before studying at the Guildhall School of Music in London.

Career
Bainbridge made her professional debut as the Third Lady in Die Zauberflöte at Glyndebourne in East Sussex in 1963. The following year saw her debut at the Royal Opera House in Wagner's Die Walküre. She joined the company in 1965, and appeared at Covent Garden more than a thousand times: among her roles were Amneris, Arvidson, Auntie (in Peter Grimes), Berta, Emilia, Erda, Grandma Burya, Mamma Lucia, Mistress Quickly and Suzuki. She sang in concert in the Barbican Hall, the Royal Festival Hall and the Royal Albert Hall, starring twice in the Last Night of the Proms with Colin Davis.

She accompanied the Covent Garden company on its visits to La Scala in 1976 and to Japan and South Korea in 1979. Her international career also took her to the Olympic Arts Festival in Los Angeles in 1984 and the Athens Festival in 1985, as well as to Buenos Aires and Chicago. In the 1990s. she sang in Jenufa in Tel Aviv and in Susannah in Nantes.

She contributed to several albums, including recordings of Dido and Aeneas, Eugene Onegin, The Rape of Lucretia, Peter Grimes and Sir John in Love. In 1966, she appeared in the first recording of Bernard Herrmann's opera Wuthering Heights, conducted by the composer.

Personal life
Her son, Godfrey John, was born in 1954.  She has two grandsons, Christopher John, born 1985, and Julian Robin, born 1990. She married the Jamaican Phillon Castell Morris in the 1970s.  Mr. Morris died in 1988. Bainbridge is now fully retired from singing and lives in Emsworth.

Discography
 Ralph Vaughan Williams: Five Tudor Portraits, conducted by David Willcocks, Angel, 1969
 Henry Purcell: Dido and Aeneas, conducted by Colin Davis, Philips, 1970
 Jules Massenet: Cendrillon, conducted by Julius Rudel, Columbia, 1979
 William Walton: Troilus and Cressida, conducted by Lawrence Foster, EMI, 1995

Filmography
 Dido and Aeneas (as Second Witch), 1965
 Peter Grimes (as Auntie), 1969
 The Yeomen of the Guard (as Dame Carruthers), 1975
 Peter Grimes (as Auntie), 1981
 The Yeomen of the Guard (as Dame Carruthers), 1982
 Il Trovatore  (as Azucena) , 1983

References

1930 births
Living people
20th-century British women opera singers
People from Rawtenstall
English mezzo-sopranos
English contraltos
Operatic mezzo-sopranos
Operatic contraltos
Musicians from Lancashire